Andrew M. Rohling is a United States Army lieutenant general who serves as deputy commanding general of United States Army Europe and Africa since August 2, 2022. He most recently served as the commanding general of Southern European Task Force-Africa and deputy commanding general for Africa of the United States Army Europe and Africa. He previously commanded United States Army Africa.

References

External links

|-

Year of birth missing (living people)
Living people
United States Army generals